Boris Vorobyov (Russian: Борис Воробьëв; 8 October 1949 – 17 July 2019) was a Soviet rower. He competed at the 1972 Summer Olympics in Munich with the men's eight where they came fourth.

References

1949 births
2019 deaths
Soviet male rowers
Olympic rowers of the Soviet Union
Rowers at the 1972 Summer Olympics
European Rowing Championships medalists